Marivita cryptomonadis is a Gram-negative, strictly aerobic and rod-shaped bacterium from the genus of Marivita which has been isolated from the phytoplankton Cryptomonas from seawater in Korea.

References 

Rhodobacteraceae
Bacteria described in 2009